Pine Hills is an unincorporated community in San Diego County, California, about a mile south and slightly west of Julian.  It is located along and at the southern end of Pine Hills Road, about two miles south of state Highway 78.  The residents of Pine Hills have an address in Julian in the 92036 zip code.

Pine Hills is located largely within the Cleveland National Forest on a knoll that extends from about  asl to about  asl. The community includes the Pine Hills Lodge and the YMCA Camps Marston and Raintree, and is near William Heise County Park—Pine Hills Fire Station and Robotic Weather Station. The Pine Hills Water District is based in the community. Many homes in Pine Hills burnt in the 2003 Cedar Fire.

History
Pine Hills had its own post office from September 11, 1913, to June 30, 1931, when it was closed and moved to Julian.

References

Unincorporated communities in San Diego County, California
Unincorporated communities in California